Youngofiber is an extinct genus of beavers from Miocene China and Japan.

References

Prehistoric beavers
Prehistoric rodent genera
Fossils of China
Fossils of Japan
Miocene mammals of Asia